The Great Illustrated Classics book series offers easy-to-read adaptations of well known literary classics, featuring large print and illustrations on every other page. The series is targeted at children, but the writing style is suitable for readers of all ages. There are currently 66 titles.

The series is owned, published, and sold by Waldman Publishing Corporation under the Baronet Books imprint. As of 2022, each release is available for purchase directly from the publisher's website, including bundled volumes of certain titles.

Great Illustrated Classics

Classic Stories

Additional Titles

Great American Hero Series 

 Daniel Boone
 Benjamin Franklin
 George Washington
 Babe Ruth
 Eleanor Roosevelt
 Clara Barton
 Martin Luther King
 Jackie Robinson

See also

 Classics Illustrated

References

External links
Official website

Series of books